Pardisan is a neighbourhood in south of Qom, in Iran. It has a population of 100,000.

A major part of Pardisan's population are clerics of Islamic Seminary who inhabited Pardisan following the mass-building program managed by The Center for Services for Islamic Seminaries (CSIS) during two decades.

Pardisan City is considered the academic region of Qom in which many universities and academic institutes are located, such as The Islamic Azad University, University of Religions and Denominations (URD), Qom Campus of Tehran University, Payam-i Nur University, Research Institute of Hawzah and University, Research Institute of Shi'a Studies,  and Qom Human Sciences and Technology Park

Qom County